Shurik (also Romanized as Shūrīk; also known as Shoorik Sakaman and Shuruk) is a village in Sokmanabad Rural District, Safayyeh District, Khoy County, West Azerbaijan Province, Iran. At the 2006 census, its population was 354, in 80 families.

References 

Populated places in Khoy County